Jamiat Eslah ("Afghan Society for Social Reforms & Development") (Persian: جمعیت اصلاح افغانستان) is an Islamist nonprofit organization based in Afghanistan. Established in 2004, it operates in Kabul and other important cities of Afghanistan, and is financed by a number of Afghan intellectuals, teachers and businessman. 

“Jameiat Eslah of Afghanistan” is social institution founded within Islamic thoughts in order to maintain beliefs, ideas, ethics, values and Islamic culture; and operates with the purpose of the development of personal and social life of Afghan people-all Afghan men and women; and since has been established by the sons of this land, it has put addressing the needs and problems of the country on the top of its religious responsibilities and national priorities.

“Jameiat Eslah” has been established to gather all the caring and sincere characters of the country around this ring and breed them in a way that night and day they spend in gain of the pleasant of Allah Almighty and in the reformative effort for the people and their homeland, they may strive in the pursuit of independence, territorial integrity, and to protect religious and national values and Islamic identity with their own lives and work.  

In the recent bombings of Afghanistan, one of the prominent associates of this organization was killed, Mohammad Atef.

References 

Islamic organisations based in Afghanistan
2004 establishments in Afghanistan